Kuan Chung-ming (born 15 August 1956) is a Taiwanese politician and academic. He was the last minister of the Council for Economic Planning and Development from 2013 to 2014 and served as the first minister of the succeeding government agency, the National Development Council (NDC), from 2014 to 2015. He is currently the President of National Taiwan University and a Chair Professor in the Department of Finance of National Taiwan University.

ROC Council for Economic Planning and Development Ministry

Taiwan's Q1 2013 economic growth
Kuan said in May 2013 that he was surprised at Taiwan's Q1 2013 economic growth rate of 1.54%, much lower than the forecast value of 3.26%. This was due to the low consumption by private sectors in Taiwan. Before the numbers were released, the CEPD aimed for Taiwan to show 4% overall economic growth that year, and to reach the original goal would require 5% economic growth for the remaining quarters of the year. However, investments in private sectors were rising at the time, an indication of a positive economic outlook.

Taiwan's 2013 global competitiveness ranking decline
Commenting on Taiwan's declining ranking as measured by the International Institute for Management Development in the Global Competitiveness Report released at the end of May 2013, Kuan said that it is not that Taiwan did not improve, but that other nations improved at a faster rate than Taiwan. He added that the business regulations have been relaxed in Taiwan but not as much as what have been done in other countries.

He resigned his post as National Development Council head in January 2015. Kuan had attempted to resign in a month prior but was persuaded to stay at the time.

National Taiwan University presidential selection
On 5 January 2018, Kuan was elected to succeed Yang Pan-chyr as president of National Taiwan University. Shortly after his election, Kuan stated that he would work to help NTU establish international partnerships with other institutions and attract more international students by offering more dual-degree programs. Before taking office, Kuan was accused of an unresolved conflict of interest regarding Richard Tsai. Tsai was a member of the NTU presidential search committee, but neither he or Kuan had publicly declared that they both served on the board of Taiwan Mobile. Additionally, Chang Liao Wan-chien accused Kuan of plagiarism in a paper presented in May 2017. Upon further investigation, NTU cleared Kuan of plagiarism. Subsequently, the government looked into possible violations of the Classified National Security Information Protection Act. In March 2018, a group of NTU academics and alumni filed a complaint with the Taipei District Prosecutors’ Office against Kuan's appointment as university president. The controversy resulted in the resignation of education minister Pan Wen-chung in April. Soon after Wu Maw-kuen took office, the education ministry chose not to approve Kuan's selection. Wu's successor Yeh Jiunn-rong announced on 24 December 2018 that Kuan's appointment had been approved. Yeh resigned from his post the next day. Kuan was inaugurated as president of National Taiwan University on 8 January 2019.

Impeachment
The Control Yuan started an investigation into Kuan's work with Next Magazine in April 2018. The probe found that Kuan wrote for the publication from 2010 to 2016, which overlapped with his tenure as a government minister between February 2012 and February 2015. Kuan's writings for Next Magazine while serving on the Executive Yuan constituted a violation of Article 14 of the Civil Servant Work Act, which barred civil servants from taking on outside work. Upon its conclusion in January 2019, the Control Yuan voted 7–4 to impeach Kuan. The Judicial Yuan's Public Functionary Disciplinary Sanction Commission then issued Kuan a reprimand in September 2019.

References

Academic staff of the National Taiwan University
Living people
Government ministers of Taiwan
1956 births
University of California, Davis alumni
Members of Academia Sinica
Presidents of National Taiwan University